One South Church (formally United Bank Tower and UniSource Energy Tower) is a 23 story office building located in Tucson, Arizona. 

At 23 stories high, One South Church is the tallest building in Tucson, and is a prominent fixture in the city's skyline. "The Tower", or the "Copper Building" as it is often referred to by locals, is home to a variety of office tenants, including New York Life, Regus, and some of Arizona's largest law firms. The building has its own parking garage located underneath the building.

The building was designed by Fentress Bradbrum Associates of Denver as one of two twin towers in a city center complex. The second tower was never built. Developers of the project were Reliance Development Group of New York and Venture West Group of Tucson. Construction started in 1985 M. M Sundt Construction Company of Tucson was the general contractor. When opened in 1986 the building was known as the United Bank Tower. It was later known as the UniSource Energy Tower

In October 2015, One South Church was acquired by local ownership group 1SC Partners, LLC, managed by Zach Fenton of ZFI Holdings, LLC.

Picture gallery

References

External links 
 Official website

Skyscrapers in Tucson, Arizona
Skyscraper office buildings in Arizona

Office buildings completed in 1986
1986 establishments in Arizona